Michael Hammond (born 1957) is an American linguist and professor at the University of Arizona. He was head of the Department of Linguistics from 2001 to 2011. He is the author or editor of six books on a variety of topics from Syntactic Typology, The Phonology of English, to Computational linguistics. He is known for his research on meter and poetics. He has also published more than 40 articles and presented at over 60 conferences on these topics. He serves on the editorial board of several major journals.

Education and early career 
Hammond received his BA in linguistics from UCLA in 1979 and his PhD in 1984. His PhD thesis on phonology was published as part of the Outstanding Dissertations in Linguistics series. From 1983 to 1984 he was an assistant professor in the Department of Linguistics at the University of Minnesota, and from 1984 to 1988 at the University of Wisconsin–Milwaukee. He joined the University of Arizona faculty in 1988.

Selected publications

Books
  
 

Articles and book chapters

References

External links
 Official web site

Linguists from the United States
1957 births
Living people
University of California, Los Angeles alumni
University of Arizona faculty